The 1968 New York Jets season was the ninth season for the team in the American Football League (AFL). The team had the most successful season in franchise history. Trying to improve upon their 8–5–1 record of 1967, they won the AFL Eastern Division with an 11–3 record. They defeated the defending champion Oakland Raiders in the AFL championship game, and earned the right to play in Super Bowl III against the NFL champion Baltimore Colts. In a stunning upset, marked by fourth-year quarterback Joe Namath's famous "guarantee" of victory, the Jets defeated the heavily favored Colts 16–7. The Jets have yet to return to the Super Bowl, making them and the New Orleans Saints the only teams to have won their only championship game, also holding the longest appearance drought in NFL history, having not appeared in the 53 complete seasons since this game.

On April 2, 2007, NFL Network aired America's Game: The Super Bowl Champions, the 1968 New York Jets, with team commentary from Joe Namath, Gerry Philbin and Don Maynard, and narrated by Alec Baldwin. The Jets ranked #24 on the 100 greatest teams of all time presented by the NFL on its 100th anniversary. Of those 24, only three came before the AFL-NFL Merger. The Jets were the highest ranked team that played in the AFL, and also the highest pre-merger team not coached by Vince Lombardi.

Offseason 
On May 21, Sonny Werblin sold his shares in the Jets to his partners Don Lillis, Leon Hess, Townsend Martin, and Phil Isselin. Lillis became the president on May 21, but died on July 23, and Isselin was appointed president on August 6. Leon Hess the founder of Hess gas station made the famous Hess truck after the New York Jets color scheme

Draft

Personnel

Staff/Coaches

Roster

Preseason

Schedule

Regular season

Regular season schedule

Results 

(*) Played at Legion Field, Birmingham since Boston Red Sox refused to rent Fenway Park to Patriots.

Standings

Game summary

Week 2: at Kansas City Chiefs

Week 3: at Boston Patriots

Week 4: at Buffalo Bills 

This game, won by the Buffalo Bills at the old War Memorial Stadium (known as the rock pile) in Buffalo was the only win for the Bills all season. A win over the eventual Super Bowl champions.

Week 5: vs. San Diego Chargers

Week 6: vs. Denver Broncos

Week 7: at Houston Oilers

Week 8: vs. Boston Patriots

Week 9: vs. Buffalo Bills

Week 10: vs. Houston Oilers

Week 11 at Oakland Raiders 

The 1968 season also saw the Jets involved in one of the most notorious incidents in television history, an incident that would change the way television networks carried sporting events for decades to come. On November 17, 1968, just before 7:00 pm Eastern time, the Jets scored late to take a 32–29 lead over the Oakland Raiders with 1:05 left. NBC cut to a commercial, and then everywhere but the West Coast showed the movie Heidi, a show which NBC had promoted extensively for the sweeps period. Outraged fans bombarded NBC headquarters in New York with phone calls demanding the game be restored; so many phone calls were made that they eventually knocked out the NBC switchboard. Even though a decision was made to carry the game to conclusion, this decision could not be communicated, thus resulting in the movie starting on schedule.

Fans' ire was further fueled when they discovered that NBC's cutting away from the game denied them from seeing live a dramatic finish. On the Raiders' second play from scrimmage on the next drive, Daryle Lamonica threw a 46-yard touchdown pass to Charlie Smith, giving the Raiders a 36–32 lead. On the ensuing kickoff, Earl Christy of the Jets fumbled at the 10-yard line, which the Raiders' Preston Ridlehuber converted into another touchdown, ultimately giving the Raiders a 43–32 victory. Much of the country learned of this final outcome only via a bottom-of-screen crawl line shown during the movie. This incident, dubbed the Heidi Game, resulted in most television networks and sports leagues amending their television policies to ensure that games in progress would be broadcast to their conclusion, no matter what, even if it meant delaying or canceling the rest of the network's lineup, and even if the game's outcome seemed assured.

Week 12: at San Diego Chargers

Week 13: vs. Miami Dolphins

Week 14: vs. Cincinnati Bengals

Week 15: at Miami Dolphins

Postseason 
 On December 29, Weeb Ewbank became the first coach to win titles in the National Football League and in the American Football League. His former team, the Baltimore Colts won the 1968 NFL Championship on December 29 as well. The Colts defeated the Cleveland Browns by a score of 34–0.

AFL Championship

Super Bowl III

The Guarantee 

In January 1969, the Jets would reach the pinnacle of their existence and provide the moment that would indicate the AFL's coming of age. Under Namath's guidance, the Jets rose to the top of the AFL, defeating the Oakland Raiders in a thrilling AFL championship game, 27–23. The win qualified them to represent their league in a game that was being referred to for the first time as the Super Bowl (and referred to retroactively as Super Bowl III). They were pitted against the champions of the NFL, the Baltimore Colts. At the time, the AFL was considered to be inferior to the NFL, and most considered the Jets to be considerable underdogs and treated them as such. That would change three nights before the game while Namath was being honored by the Miami Touchdown Club as its Player of the Year. Namath took exception to a heckling Colts fan and used that moment to lament the lack of respect his team had gotten to that point. He then said "The Jets will win Sunday. I guarantee it." His audacious remark proved correct, as the Jets created one of the greatest upsets in football history by defeating the Colts 16–7. This victory showed that the AFL was capable of competing with the NFL.

Scoring summary

Game officials

Preseason

Regular season game officials

Postseason

Media

Stats 

Passing

Rushing

Receiving

Kicking

Punting

Kick Return

Punt Return

Defense & Fumbles

Scoring Summary

Team

Quarter-by-quarter

Pop Culture 
In the 2017 song Wild Thoughts by DJ Khaled, Rihanna makes a reference to the '68 Jets.

Awards and honors 
 Joe Namath, AFL MVP
 Joe Namath, UPI AFL-AFC Player of the Year
 Joe Namath, Super Bowl Most Valuable Player

References

External links 
 1968 team stats

New York Jets seasons
Super Bowl champion seasons
American Football League championship seasons
New York Jets
New York Jets
1960s in Queens